Juno Temple is a 6,896-elevation summit located in the eastern Grand Canyon, in Coconino County of northern Arizona, United States. It is located 1.5 miles east-northeast of the Cape Final overlook, and is about 1.0 mi north of Jupiter Temple, its nearest high neighbor. It also lies about 3.5 miles from the Colorado River, at the headwaters of the Basalt Creek and Canyon watershed, its major drainage on its east flank.Unlike its Jupiter Temple neighbor which has a prominence of Coconino Sandstone on a long ridgeline, Juno Temple is a ridgeline of eroded Supai Group, and is stained dark, unlike the often bright, orange-reds of the common Supai Group “redbeds”.

References

External links

 Aerial view, Juno Temple, Mountainzone
 Juno Temple photo by Harvey Butchart

Grand Canyon
Grand Canyon National Park
Colorado Plateau
Landforms of Coconino County, Arizona
Mountains of Coconino County, Arizona
North American 1000 m summits